is a judicial decision of the Supreme Court of the United Kingdom relating to contract law, concerning consideration and estoppel. Specifically it concerned the effectiveness of "no oral variation" clauses, which provide that any amendments or waiver in relation to the contract must be in writing.

Facts
Rock Advertising Ltd claimed that it should not have been locked out of a building, owned by MWB Ltd, because it had renegotiated arrears for rent and paid £3500 under it. MWB Ltd argued that in any event the renegotiated deal would be unenforceable, because there Rock Advertising Ltd agreed there would be "no oral variation" of the written deal, and there was no consideration for a change. MWB Ltd licensed its office space at Marble Arch Tower in Bryanston Street, London, to Rock Advertising Ltd, but after Rock Advertising Ltd requested more space it fell into arrears for fees and charges. MWB locked out Rock Advertising and gave notice, as it could under the contract. Rock Advertising claimed its exclusion was wrongful, because it had an oral agreement with MWB's credit controller to reschedule the licence fee payments to clear the arrears, and it had paid £3500 that day under it. MWB denied any agreement, and argued it was unenforceable for lacking consideration, and oral agreements were prohibited in the written contract clause 7.6, which said that the written agreement was the entire agreement and no other representations could become part of it.

HHJ Moloney QC held MWB had agreed to the variation, there was adequate consideration, but the written agreement precluded an oral agreement.

Judgment

Court of Appeal
Kitchin LJ held that the anti-oral variation clause did not preclude any variation, a powerful consideration being party autonomy. A subsequent variation meant the written clause was ineffective. Moreover, if one party derives a benefit from a promise to pay more money, that will be consideration (Williams v Roffey Bros). The payment of £3500 and the promise for further payments constituted sufficient consideration. So the oral variation was binding for as long as payments were made.

McCombe LJ agreed with both. Arden LJ concurred and gave further reasons.

Supreme Court
The Supreme Court held that clause 7.6 precluded Rock Advertising from arguing that another oral agreement changed the terms of the written agreement on the facts.

Lord Sumption said the following:

See also

 English contract law

Notes

References
West law edge uk

English contract case law